People Are Expensive is the fourth studio album by English rock band Echobelly.

Track listing

All songs written by Sonya Madan and Glenn Johansson.
 "Fear of Flying" – 5:02
 "Tell Me Why" – 4:56
 "Down to Earth" – 2:53
 "People Are Expensive" – 2:18
 "Digit" – 5:45
 "Dying" – 4:58
 "Kali Yuga" – 5:29
 "Everything Is All" – 5:01
 "A Map Is Not the Territory" – 6:12
 "Ondine" – 4:09
 "Point Dume" – 7:34

Singles

"Digit" was released as the first EP. 
Tell Me Why" was released as the second single and reached no. 111 on the UK singles chart.
"Kali Yuga" was released as the third single and reached no. 175 on the UK singles chart.

Personnel
Echobelly
 Sonya Madan - vocals
 Glenn Johansson - guitar
 Ruth Owen - bass
 Andy Henderson - drums

References

2001 albums
Echobelly albums